Catherine LaBelle Parks (born December 10, 1956) is an American actress who has starred in movies and on television. She is perhaps best known for her roles in the 1982 horror movie Friday the 13th Part III, as Vera Sanchez, and the 1989 comedy Weekend at Bernie's.

Parks was born in Orlando, Florida and grew up in Tampa, Florida. She graduated from Leto High School and attended University of South Florida where she was a theater major.

Parks began doing beauty pageants while still residing in Florida, winning Miss Hillsborough County and Miss Florida before becoming a runner-up in the Miss America 1978 pageant.

She received her Screen Actors Guild card after appearing in the film Looker.

She has appeared on television shows, her first being Behind the Screen, and she later had a recurring role on the short-lived CBS series Zorro and Son in 1983. Parks has made guest appearances on TV shows such as The Love Boat, Three's Company, Mickey Spillane's Mike Hammer, Street Hawk, Tales from the Darkside, Hunter, and Empty Nest.

In 2005, Parks left Hollywood and now resides in Tampa. She remains an actress and continues to pursue various movie and television projects as a writer, producer and actress.

Filmography

References

External links

1956 births
American film actresses
American television actresses
Actresses from Florida
Living people
Miss America 1970s delegates
20th-century American people
21st-century American women